Felix Kalu Nmecha (born 10 October 2000) is a German footballer who plays as a midfielder for Bundesliga club VfL Wolfsburg.

Club career
Nmecha made his Manchester City debut in the second leg of the EFL Cup semi-final against Burton Albion, replacing Oleksandr Zinchenko in the 67th minute. Manchester City won the game 1–0. Nmecha scored the winning goal in the U18 Premier League Cup final on 19 March 2019, against Middlesbrough U18. On 3 November 2020, Nmecha provided an assist for João Cancelo on his UEFA Champions League debut for City as a substitute for Kevin De Bruyne in a 3–0 home win over Olympiacos in the group stage. Nmecha was released by City at the end of his contract on 30 June 2021.

Nmecha joined Wolfsburg after leaving Manchester City, shortly after his brother Lukas made the same move.

International career
Nmecha has represented both Germany and England at youth international level.

On 17 March 2023, he received his first official call-up to the German senior national team for the friendlies against Peru and Belgium.

Personal life
Nmecha is the younger brother of fellow player Lukas Nmecha. Both were born in Germany to a Nigerian fathher and German mother, before moving to England at a young age.

Career statistics

References

2000 births
Living people
Footballers from Hamburg
German footballers
Germany under-21 international footballers
Germany youth international footballers
English footballers
England youth international footballers
Association football midfielders
Manchester City F.C. players
VfL Wolfsburg players
Bundesliga players
German sportspeople of Nigerian descent
German emigrants to England
English people of Nigerian descent
English people of German descent
Naturalised citizens of the United Kingdom